Metal: A Headbanger's Journey is a 2005 documentary film directed by Sam Dunn with Scot McFadyen and Jessica Wise. The film follows 31-year-old Dunn, a Canadian anthropologist, who has been a heavy metal fan since the age of 12. Dunn sets out across the world to uncover the various opinions on heavy metal music, including its origins, culture, controversy, and the reasons it is loved by so many people. The film made its debut at the 2005 Toronto International Film Festival, and was released as a two-disc special edition DVD in the US on 19 September 2006. 
 
A follow-up to the film titled Global Metal premiered at the Bergen International Film Festival on 17 October 2007, and saw limited release in theatres in June 2008. Dunn has also elaborated upon his "Heavy Metal Family Tree" in the VH1 series Metal Evolution, which focuses on one subgenre per episode.

Contents
The film discusses the traits and originators of some of metal's many subgenres, including the new wave of British heavy metal, power metal, nu metal, glam metal, thrash metal, black metal, and death metal. Dunn uses a family-tree-type flowchart to document some of the most popular metal subgenres. The film also explores various aspects of heavy metal culture. Notable segments include Dunn taking a trip to the Wacken Open Air festival, an interview with Dee Snider providing an analysis of the PMRC attack on heavy metal music, and an interview with several Norwegian black metal bands.

Interviews
The most insightful information given in the film comes from candid interviews with popular artists from metal's past and present. Notable interviews come from:

Non-musicians
 Bob Ezrin, record producer (Alice Cooper, Kiss, Pink Floyd)
 Deena Weinstein, sociologist
 Robert Walser, musicologist
 Malcolm Dome, journalist, writer, DJ
 Mike Guitor
 Sam Guitor, fan
 Joe Bottiglieri, fan
 Chuck Klosterman, writer
 Eric Bryan, fan, bass player (Bryan currently plays bass for Los Angeles thrash metal band, Anger as Art)
 Robert Kampf, founder of Century Media
 Joey Severance, tour manager
 Eddie Trunk, DJ
 Rob Jones, DJ
 Pamela Des Barres, groupie, writer, author of I'm With The Band
 Donna Gaines, sociologist
 Gavin Baddeley, writer
 Monte Conner, senior VP A&R – Roadrunner Records
 Rolf Rasmussen, assistant minister of the Åsane church
 Brian Slagel, owner/CEO of Metal Blade Records
 Rose Dyson, writer
 Keith Kahn-Harris, writer

Soundtrack
Accept – "Balls to the Wall"
Arch Enemy – "Silent Wars" (live)
Blue Cheer – "Summertime Blues"
Burn To Black – "Winter Rancid Skies"
Burn To Black – "Into Shadow"
Burn To Black – "Microcosmic"
Burn To Black – "Hellspell"
Cannibal Corpse – "Decency Defied"
Children of Bodom – "Needled 24/7"
David MacDonaldson – "Partita In C Minor – Chorale"
Diamond Head – "Am I Evil?"
Dio – "Heaven and Hell" (live from A Special From The Spectrum)
Emperor – "Inno a Satana"
Enslaved – "Return to Yggdrasil"
Enslaved – "Havenless"
Girlschool – "C'Mon Let's Go"
Iron Maiden – "Run to the Hills" (live from Rock in Rio)
Iron Maiden – "The Number of the Beast"
Lamb of God – "Laid to Rest"
Metallica – "Master of Puppets"
Metallica – "Fight Fire With Fire"
Mötley Crüe – "Girls, Girls, Girls"
Motörhead – "Ace of Spades"
Motörhead – "Killed by Death"
Rage Against the Machine – "Killing in the Name"
Richard Wagner – "Faust Overture"
Rush – "Working Man"
Sepultura – "Arise"
Sepultura – "Beneath the Remains"
Slayer – "Disciple"
Slipknot – "(Sic)" (live)
Tim Renwick and Andy Caine – "Ain't Got a Pot To..."
Twisted Sister – "We're Not Gonna Take It"
Van Halen – "Eruption" (live)
Venom – "Bloodlust"

"Definitive metal family tree"
The chart from the film documents Dunn's view on the progression of subgenres of metal that have spawned over time as well as other styles of rock (i.e. hard rock, shock rock, punk rock, and hardcore) that have influence these styles of metal, while also attempting to list the prime examples of bands that fall into each category. Below is a typed version of that chart, which can be found on the second disc of the film's special edition DVD package. A new version was presented in the related TV series Metal Evolution which included a new "Pre-Metal" field that listed non-metal bands that had an influence on heavy metal and also listed additional bands as examples of the various subgenres.

Early Metal (1966–1971) 

Cream; Jimi Hendrix; Blue Cheer; Deep Purple; Led Zeppelin; MC5; Mountain; The Stooges; Black Sabbath

Original Hard Rock (1974–1979)

Thin Lizzy; Blue Öyster Cult; Aerosmith; AC/DC; Ted Nugent

Shock Rock (1968–1983)
Arthur Brown; Alice Cooper; New York Dolls; Kiss; Ozzy Osbourne; W.A.S.P.  

Early Punk (1976–1979)
The Ramones; The Damned; Sex Pistols; The Clash; The Dead Boys

Power Metal (1976–present)
Scorpions; Judas Priest; Rainbow; Accept; Manowar; Dio; Yngwie J. Malmsteen; Helloween; Blind Guardian; HammerFall; Primal Fear

New wave of British heavy metal (1979–1983)
Motörhead; Saxon; Iron Maiden; Angel Witch; Girlschool; Tygers of Pan Tang; Diamond Head
Progressive Metal (1970–present)
Uriah Heep; Rush; Queensrÿche; Savatage; Fates Warning; Voivod; Dream Theater; Meshuggah; Symphony X; Evergrey

Glam Metal (1973–1990)
Slade; Sweet; Hanoi Rocks; Mötley Crüe; Twisted Sister; Poison; Cinderella; Skid Row

Pop Metal (1978–present)
Quiet Riot; Van Halen; Whitesnake; Def Leppard; Europe; Dokken; Lita Ford; Ratt; Guns N' Roses; Winger; Warrant; Doro; The Darkness

Doom Metal (1982–present)
Witchfinder General; Trouble; Candlemass; Cathedral; Kyuss; Today Is The Day

Original Hardcore (1980–1986)
Agnostic Front; D.O.A.; The Exploited; Bad Brains; Misfits; GBH; Discharge; Dead Kennedys; Minor Threat; Black Flag

Thrash Metal (1983–present)
 Metallica; Slayer; Anthrax; Megadeth; Exodus; Overkill; Kreator; Destruction; Sodom; Testament; Nuclear Assault; Death Angel; Pantera; Sepultura; Children of Bodom

First wave of black metal (1981–1986)
Venom; Bathory; Mercyful Fate; Celtic Frost

Norwegian black metal (1990–present)
Mayhem; Darkthrone; Immortal; Gorgoroth; Emperor; Satyricon; Enslaved; Dimmu Borgir; Cradle of Filth

Grindcore (1987–present)
Napalm Death; Carcass; Repulsion; Exhumed; Extreme Noise Terror; Cephalic Carnage; Brutal Truth

Death Metal (1985–present)
Possessed; Death; Morbid Angel; Obituary; Deicide; Cannibal Corpse; Immolation; Autopsy; Nile; Dying Fetus

Swedish Death Metal (1990–present)
Grave; Entombed; At the Gates; Unleashed; Dismember; Arch Enemy; Soilwork; In Flames; Dark Tranquillity; The Haunted

Goth Metal (aka Doom Metal on the DVD) (1990–present)
Paradise Lost; Tiamat; Therion; Type O Negative; My Dying Bride; Anathema; Theatre of Tragedy; Katatonia; Opeth

Metalcore (1985–present)
Corrosion of Conformity; Suicidal Tendencies; Dirty Rotten Imbeciles; Machine Head; Stormtroopers of Death; Hatebreed; The Dillinger Escape Plan

Grunge (1988–1994)
Green River; The Melvins; Soundgarden; Mudhoney; Nirvana; Alice in Chains; Mother Love Bone; Stone Temple Pilots; Pearl Jam
Industrial Metal (1988–present)
Ministry; White Zombie; Godflesh; Nine Inch Nails; Fear Factory; Marilyn Manson; Static-X

Hard Alternative (1985–present)
Faith No More; Jane's Addiction; Prong; Living Colour; The Smashing Pumpkins; Rage Against the Machine; Tool

Nu Metal (1994–2003)
Biohazard; KoЯn; Limp Bizkit; Slipknot; Godsmack; Coal Chamber; System of a Down; Disturbed; Kittie

New wave of American metal (2000–present)
Shadows Fall; Lamb of God; Darkest Hour; Chimaira; Killswitch Engage; Unearth; God Forbid

Timeline

Reception
The film received mostly positive reviews. It currently holds a 90% approval rating on Rotten Tomatoes, with an average rating of 6.9/10 and the critical consensus being: "Made by a metalhead, this documentary of the musical genre both informs and entertains with its range of interviewees."

Criticism
Some brief controversy arose over the film's depiction of black metal, which many fans of the genre saw as being one-sided and biased during a screening documented in the film. In the special features to the DVD of the film, Dunn attempted a restitution to the concerns of the black metal fans by including an additional featurette.

References

External links
Official Website

2005 films
English-language Canadian films
Canadian documentary films
Documentary films about heavy metal music and musicians
2005 documentary films
Music fandom
2000s English-language films
2000s Canadian films